José Izquierdo may refer to:

José Izquierdo (footballer, born 1980), Spanish retired footballer
José Izquierdo (footballer, born 1992), Colombian footballer
Jose Izquierdo Encarnacion (born 1957), former Secretary of State in Puerto Rico
José Guillermo Izquierdo Stella (1936–2010), former Puerto Rican politician
José Luis Izquierdo (born 1933), Spanish Olympic weightlifter